George Monro (1801 – January 5, 1878) was a businessman and political figure in Upper Canada/Canada West. He was also a member of the Orange Order in Canada.

He was born in Scotland in 1801 and came to Niagara in Upper Canada with his parents. In 1814, he moved to York (Toronto) and entered the grocery business with his brother Jun Monro; he later struck out on his own sometime around 1824, becoming an importer and wholesaler. His business was regarded as one of the grandest mercantile businesses in town. The business was located on King Street and the building doubled as a residence and store. In 1830 he was one of the founding directors of the Home District Savings Bank of Toronto along with notable local figures like William Warren Baldwin, Jesse Ketchum and A.T. Wood.

He was elected to city council in 1834 and served as mayor in 1841. He served as a captain in the local militia during the Upper Canada Rebellion. Monro ran unsuccessfully for the legislative assembly in the same year. In 1844, he was defeated by James Edward Small in the 3rd riding of York but was declared elected when Small was disqualified. He was defeated in the next general election in 1848 and he retired from business around 1856.

He died in Toronto in 1878.

Munro Park

Munro's farm, Painted Post Farm, was 25 acres property in The Beaches area acquired by George Monro. A 6-10 acres parcel was leased out by the Monro family following the ex-Mayor's death and turned into an amusement park that existed from 1896 to 1906. The park was run by Toronto Railway Company until the lease expired. The site has since become a residential area and areas along the lake are now part of the Beaches Park. It was one of three nearby amusement parks,  nearby Victoria Park also closed in 1906.

Personal

Monro's grandson Neville Fisher Monro married Ethel Muriel Gooderham, great-grand-daughter of Gooderham and Worts's William Gooderham Sr.

References

External links
 
City of Toronto biographies

1801 births
1878 deaths
Members of the Legislative Assembly of the Province of Canada from Canada West
Mayors of Toronto
People from Niagara-on-the-Lake
Scottish emigrants to pre-Confederation Ontario
Immigrants to Upper Canada